WRVM is a Christian radio station licensed to Suring, Wisconsin, broadcasting on 102.7 MHz FM.  WRVM serves all of Northeast Wisconsin, including Green Bay and Appleton. The station began broadcasting September 17, 1967, and has always aired a Christian format.

WRVM is also simulcast on full powered stations WHJL 88.1 in Merrill, which serves North-Central Wisconsin including; Wausau, Rhinelander, and Woodruff, WMVM 90.7 in Goodman which serves the Iron Mountain-Kingsford area of the Upper Peninsula of Michigan, WPVM 88.5 in Sturgeon Bay, which serves Door County, WYVM 90.9 in Sheboygan, and WXVM 104.1 in Merrill which also covers Wausau. WRVM is also heard on numerous low powered translators throughout Northern, Central, and Eastern Wisconsin, as well as Michigan's Upper Peninsula.

Programming
WRVM's programming consists of Christian talk and teaching as well as traditional Christian music.  Christian talk and teaching shows heard on WRVM include; Insight for Living with Chuck Swindoll, Revive Our Hearts with Nancy DeMoss Wolgemuth, Grace to You with John MacArthur, Thru the Bible with J. Vernon McGee, Truth for Life with Alistair Begg, Joni & Friends, In the Market with Janet Parshall, Turning Point with David Jeremiah, and Unshackled!.

Simulcasts

Full powered stations

Low powered translators

References

External links

RVM
1967 establishments in Wisconsin
Radio stations established in 1967
Oconto County, Wisconsin